The history of Socialism in Colombia goes back as far as the 1920s and has its roots in the ideas of the Russian October Revolution. Today guerrilla groups, self-proclaimed communists, state that they want to seize state power in Colombia by violent means, and organizations such as the National Liberation Army (ELN) continue their four decades old war with the United States-backed Colombian government.

Many social science experts around the world who have studied  historical events in Colombia note  the influence and intervention, as in many other South American countries, of the United States and of the Soviet Union, to stop or enhance, given the case, communism in Colombia. Some important figures in the history of communism in Colombia are Jorge Eliécer Gaitán, Jaime Pardo Leal, Carlos Pizarro Leongómez, Bernardo Jaramillo Ossa, and Jaime Bateman Cayón, among others. Many of these figures were persecuted or eventually assassinated. According to critics, evidence of the involvement of members of the Colombian Army and of United States organizations like the Central Intelligence Agency was present in many cases.

History
In the early 20th century, Colombia was linked to the international economy through its mass exportation of coffee, minerals, fruits, and even oil. Such exportations paired with importation of European goods, international loans, and the presence of international companies, such as the United Fruit Company and Tropical Oil Company, created a booming Colombian economy. However, Colombian society still consisted mainly of poor laborers living in rural, undeveloped land. Further burdening the booming nation, was a history of civil wars and political corruption which pit the liberal and conservative factions of Colombian governance against one another to the detriment of the public. This set the stage for a laborer uprising inspired by the Russian October Revolution.

Origins of Socialist Ideology 
The labor movement in Colombia was marked by the differences it held compared to movements in other Latin American countries. While socialist ideology in countries like Argentina and Brazil were influenced by European immigration, Colombia had no such connection to left-wing European ideologies. Rather, the labor movements in Colombia were inspired by the disconnect laborers felt with the major political parties. The perceived lack of representation led to the creation of Colombia's first Socialist party in 1919. The creation of the party, inspired by Bolshevik ideology and the end of the first World War, was led by Colombian intellectuals and left wing media. Among these figures, was Luis Tejada, a co-editor of left wing newspaper El Sol', who published multiple articles praising the importance of Lenin. Tejada, alongside Russian immigrant Silvestre Savitski, further supported the study of Marxism among the liberal youth.

In the early years of the party, no major steps were taken to establish a connection with the international community of Communist parties despite the importance of international affairs being discussed and analyzed in the Third Socialist Conference of 1921. The proposal to seek membership in the Comintern was rejected, however it became apparent that Bolshevik ideology was growing in popularity amongst Colombian Socialist intellectuals. After failure in the 1922 elections, backing moderate Socialist candidate Benjamin Herrera, this iteration of the party began to split apart due to the lack of interest in joining international efforts to pursue communist thought. However, the party ideology was revived by young Colombian Bolsheviks who took over the Socialist Congress in 1924.

Pro-communist ideology amongst intellectuals was fully displayed in 1924 at the Socialist Congress held in the Colombian capital, Bogota. The leaders of this congress broke ties with the previous three socialist conferences and immediately pursued international involvement. This conference became the first attempt for Colombian socialists to establish communications and partnership with the Moscow Third International. The conference attendees declared their affiliation to the Comintern and approved the 21 conditions of Leninism, however with no true party capable of executing such policies and establishing a political presence in Colombia, the Latin American sector of the Comintern resisted approving the affiliation. Following the conference, Socialist leader Luis Tejada died, and Silvestre Savitski was expelled from the country by the Colombia government a year later for his efforts in spreading communist doctrine.

 The Comintern and Colombian Communism 
By the mid-1920s, at the Second Worker's Congress in Bogota, socialist ideology continued expanding and was not longer moderate. The year prior to the Congress a large strike led by Labor Union leader Raul Maheca was organized against the Tropical Oil Company in Barrancabermeja which resulted in the firing of 1200 laborers and the arrest of strike leaders. The Congress proceeded by establishing a National Workers Confederation (CON) which would serve as the organization that managed and coordinated any future labor movements of the Congress. Despite serving as a radical trade union of sorts, the leaders of CON believed that the organization would better serve its purpose under the guidance of a new revolutionary party. In 1926, as part of the Third Workers Congress, the Partido Socialista Revolucionario (PSR) was established with the goal of seeking affiliation with the Comintern. This goal would be achieved when the PSR was officially recognized and approved for affiliation with the Comintern during the Sixth World Congress in 1928. Such affiliation would expedite the spread of socialism and strengthen the current labor movements in Colombia. Within a year, the Comintern and PSR leaders would be involved in one of the biggest, and deadliest strikes in Colombian history, the Banana Workers Massacre in Santa Marta.

The Banana Workers Massacre (1928-29)
Also known as the Santa Marta Massacre.

The United Fruit Company (UFCO) was a multinational company that exported fruit such as bananas and pineapples mainly from Latin American banana-growing countries to the United States and Europe. UFCO workers on banana plantations in Colombia organized a labor strike in December 1928. The national labor union leaders Raúl Eduardo Mahecha and Maria Cano who traveled to the plantations to organize the strikes demanded that the workers be given written work contracts, that they be obligated to work no more than eight hours per day and six days per week, and that the company stop the use of “food coupons”, or scrip.

The union leaders were protesting at the banana zone of Santa Marta, the capital of the Magdalena department in the north of the country.

After U.S. officials in Colombia, along with United Fruit representatives, portrayed the worker's strike as "communist" with "subversive tendency", in telegrams to the U.S. Secretary of State, the government of the United States of America threatened to invade with the U.S. Marine Corps if the Colombian government did not act to protect United Fruit’s interests.

The ruling Conservative government's President Miguel Abadia Mendez sent troops led by General Carlos Cortés Vargas to capture the strike leaders, send them to prison at Cartagena, and send additional troops to protect the economic interests of the United Fruit Company. U.S. warships carrying troops were on the way to Colombia to protect U.S. citizens working for the United fruit Company in Santa Marta and property. The Colombian army also opened fire on people who gathered at the main plaza of the city of Ciénaga to support the strikers. The popular Liberal Party leader Jorge Eliécer Gaitán used the term "La Masacre de las Bananeras" to raise opposition among Colombian society against the massacre. The Liberal Party press criticized the brutality used to break the strike by the Colombian government.

The Comintern was indirectly involved in the planning and execution of the strike in Santa Marta and its failure was openly discussed in the First Conference of Latin American Communist Parties that took place in Buenos Aires the following year. The conference sought to uncover the reasoning behind the failure of the labor uprising and determine who was to blame for it. Maheca, along with other leaders of the Partido Socialista Revolucionario, provided a report that detailed the key reasons for failure, along with other facts of the strike. Maheca reported that over 32,000 workers were armed and prepared to strike against UFCO, yet he blamed indecision from their liberal allies in Bogota for the general failure of the uprising. The Liberal party - with whom they sought a united front- did not provide solidarity with the strike or with the attempt for revolution, directly weakening the cause of the PSR. The Comintern also provided their own report outlining their interpretation of the failure in Santa Marta. The letter from the Comintern made clear the belief that the uprising would have been successful and revolutionary had it been under the leadership of a true communist party.

The Liberal Revolution (1930-45)
Liberals came into power in 1930 under the leadership of Enrique Olaya Herrera and the presidency of Alfonso López Pumarejo (1934–38). The people's uprising began after the UFCO banana workers massacre eventually brought the Liberals into power. The Colombian Communists also supported the Liberals and the social and economic issues brought up by their government.

There were many social reforms that happened in their ruling period of 15 years, causing some to call it the “Revolution on the March”. The 1936 constitutional amendments gave the government to influence the privately owned economic interests. The rights of the labor were established such as 8 hours per day, 6 days per week and the pre-informed work strike. The Liberal government influenced by the Communists thought the people's education is the most significant factor when taken into the consideration on every angle, and they taken it into the government control from the influence of the Catholic Church.

The social revolution of the Communist-influenced Liberals in Colombia lasted only about 15 years. The second term of President Alfonso López Pumarejo (1942–46) did not complete due to political pressure against him from various forces which forced him to resign. Then in 1946 the Conservatives came to power when the popular Jorge Eliécer Gaitán failed in his bid to become the Liberal Party candidate, and ran instead as an independent, thereby splitting the Liberal vote and giving the victory to Conservative candidate Mariano Ospina Perez (Mariano Ospina Perez 565,939 votes, Gabriel Turbay 441,199 votes, Jorge Eliécer Gaitán 358,957 votes).

El Bogotazo (1948)

After taking state power from Liberals in 1946, the Conservatives began to overturn Liberal reforms. The popular Colombian Liberal Party leader Jorge Eliécer Gaitán led the National Left-wing Revolutionary Union or UNIR (Unión de Izquierda Revolucionaria), and they organized protest movements against the Conservative policies which started tension between the two parties.

Gaitan was shot and killed about 1:15 p.m. on April 9, 1948 near the corner of Carrera Séptima and Jimenez de Quesada in Central Bogotá during the 9th Pan-American Conference.

After the death of Gaitán, riots erupted in Bogotá. The angry mob killed his murderer Juan Roa Sierra and dragged his body in the streets to the front of the presidential palace where they hanged it publicly. The rioters took control of all national radio stations in the city of Bogotá, and announcements were delivered against the Conservative government of Mariano Ospina Pérez. Bridges were blown up, and this caused a lack of food in the city. The airfields at Honda, Cartago, Barrancabermeja and Turbo were also taken by the people. The rioters' slogan was Yankee imperialism wants to convert us into military and economic colonies, and we must fight in defense of Colombian society.''

 La Violencia 
Following the events of "El Bogotazo", a decade long civil war broke out among the Conservative and Liberal factions of Colombian politics. The conflict, which would claim the lives of over 200,000 people, was known as "La Violencia". While directly resulting from the assassination of liberal politician Jorge Eliécer Gaitán, the rising tensions that resulted in "El Bogotazo" and "La Violencia" can be attributed to the return to power of the Conservative party in 1946 and its encouragement of seizing back territories held by liberal officials and supporters. As a result, conflict broke out among the politically polarized lower classes in the countryside of Colombia, leading to a Liberal-Conservative Civil war. By the end of the conflict, the majority of the casualties would be of peasants and laborers.

The end of the conflict came in 1958 with the development of a unified political party between the Liberal and Conservative factions in Colombia. The new bipartisan system became known as La Frente Nacional (National Front) and involved alternating political power between the Liberal and Conservative branches of the new party. This movement also resulted in the establishment of a political superpower that would effectively prevent the involvement of other political groups, such as the Colombian Communist Party (PCC) in government. The National Front system lasted until 1990.Hylton, Forrest (2006). Evil Hour in Colombia. Verso. pp. 51–52. . In that time, the new party system led to the consolidation of socio-economic, military, religious, and political power. With the support of the military, the church and corporations, the National Front effectively surpassed opposition political movements and any type of political or social reforms.

Republic of Sumapaz
A squatters' colony of some 6,000 landless emerged in parts of Cundinamarca, Tolima, Huila, Caquetá, and Meta departments, areas of rural conflict.  In the late 1940s, the so-called Republic of Sumapaz was created by Communists, and was the target of military campaigns between 1948 and 1965. The Sumapaz Republic was ended in 1958.Elsy Marulanda, Colonización y conflicto: Las lecciones del Sumapaz (1991).

Notable Colombian communists
Manuel Marulanda
Jacobo Arenas
Raúl Reyes
Alfonso Cano

Communist organizations of Colombia

Colombian Communist Party (1930–present)
FARC (1964–2017)
National Liberation Army (Colombia) (1964–present)
Communist Party of Colombia (Marxist–Leninist) (1965–present)
Popular Liberation Army (1967–present)
Movimiento Obrero Independiente y Revolucionario (1970–present)
Marxist–Leninist League of Colombia (1971–1982)
Marxist–Leninist–Maoist Tendency (1974–1982)
Proletarian Line (1976–1982)
Revolutionary Communist Group of Colombia (1982–present)
Workers Revolutionary Party of Colombia (1982–1991)
Simón Bolívar Guerrilla Coordinating Board (1987–1990s)
Guevarista Revolutionary Army (1992–2008)
Clandestine Colombian Communist Party (2000–2017)
Colombian Communist Party – Maoist (2001–present)
Revolutionary Independent Labour Movement 
Common Alternative Revolutionary Force (2017–present)

See also
Liberalism in Colombia
Conservatism in Colombia

External links
CIP Colombia Program

ReferencesDance of the Millions: Military Rule and the Social Revolution in Colombia : 1930-1956, Vernon L. Fluharty, 1975Blood and Fire: La Violencia in Antioquia, Colombia, 1946-1953, Mary Roldan, Duke University Press, 2002Diario de la resistencia de Marquetalia, Jacobo Arenas, Ediciones Abejón Mono, 1972Killing Peace: Colombia's Conflict and the Failure of U.S. Intervention, Garry M. Leech, Information Network of the Americas (INOTA), 2002War in Colombia: Made in U.S.A.''', edited by Rebeca Toledo, Teresa Gutierrez, Sara Flounders and Andy McInerney, 2003

 
FARC
Left-wing politics in Colombia
Political history of Colombia